Pavol Bencz (25 June 1936 – 18 April 2012) was a football player. He played for the Czechoslovakia national team and was the top scorer of the 1964–65 Czechoslovak First League, with 21 goals. As well as playing for his national team, he also scored twice in four appearances for Czechoslovakia B. He scored a total of 82 league goals in 182 matches, playing his club football for Jednota Trenčín and ZVL Žilina. Bencz died in Trenčín at the age of 75 on 18 April 2012.

References

Cited texts

External links

1936 births
2012 deaths
Czechoslovak footballers
Czechoslovakia international footballers
TTS Trenčín players
MŠK Žilina players
Association football forwards